Magnalium is an aluminium alloy with 5% magnesium and 95% aluminum.

Properties
Alloys with small amounts of magnesium (about 5%) exhibit greater strength, greater corrosion resistance, and lower density than pure aluminium. Such alloys are also more workable and easier to weld than pure aluminum. Alloys with high amounts of magnesium (around 50%) are brittle and more susceptible to corrosion than aluminum.

Uses
Although they are generally more expensive than aluminium, the high strength, low density, and greater workability of alloys with low amounts of magnesium leads to their use in aircraft and automobile parts.

Alloys with about 50% magnesium are brittle and corrode easily, which makes them unsuitable for most engineering uses. However, these alloys are flammable when powdered, are more resistant to corrosion than pure magnesium, and are more reactive than pure aluminium and are therefore used in pyrotechnics as a metal fuel and to produce sparks. Due to the high reactivity, magnalium burns comparably hot and forms bright yellowish white sparks. Magnalium powder also burns with a crackling sound if burnt by itself, and provides a good compromise between the reactivity of magnesium and the stability of aluminium. Another benefit for pyrotechnics is the brittleness of the alloy, as mentioned before. It is easily broken with a hammer and then ground in a coffee grinder to usable powder. It will grind in a ball mill into a fine powder in a matter of hours, as opposed to a matter of days with aluminium powder. It is much more powerful than aluminium powder (when compared at similar mesh size) and similar precautions should be taken as per magnesium. These include dangers of moisture and incompatibility with other compounds (boric acid and ammonium compounds). It is also used for making balance beams and other components of light instruments.

See also 

 Magnesium alloy
 Birmabright

References

External links
 Making Magnalium
 http://www.thegreenman.me.uk/pro/magnalium.html

Aluminium–magnesium alloys
Aluminium alloys
Magnesium alloys
Pyrotechnic fuels